Powell County is the name of two counties in the United States:

 Powell County, Kentucky
 Powell County, Montana